These are the Australian Country number-one albums of 2015, per the ARIA Charts.

See also
2015 in music
List of number-one albums of 2015 (Australia)

References

2015
Australia country albums
Number-one country albums